Water polo at the 2013 Southeast Asian Games took place at Zayyarthiri Sports Complex, Naypyidaw, Myanmar between December 6–10.

Medalists

Result

Medal table

Men's tournament
All times are Myanmar Standard Time (UTC+06:30)

References

2013
2013 Southeast Asian Games events
Southeast Asian Games